The Visayan broadbill (Sarcophanops samarensis) is a species of bird in the family Eurylaimidae where it was previously conspecific with the  wattled broadbill. It is endemic to the islands of Samar, Leyte and Bohol in the central Philippines. Its natural habitat is tropical moist lowland forests. It is threatened by habitat loss.

Description and Taxonomy 
Small, brightly coloured passerine of lowland forest on Bohol, Leyte, and Samar islands. Has a pale blue bill and deeper blue eye wattle, a black face, a streaked crown, a reddish-brown back, a dark wing with a pinkish to white wingbar, a thin white collar with some scaling above, reddish rump and tail and overall stout appearance. Underparts are white in the female and pinkish in the male. Makes short sallies for insects. Can be found in pairs, small groups, or sometimes mixed-species flocks. Unmistakable. Voice includes a plaintive whistle and a sharp .

They are sexually dimorphic in which the males have reddish-pink bellies with the females having clean white bellies. The collar of the males is reddish-pink while females have a black-and-white collar.

It is differentiated by its thinner reddish collar and white wing patch versus the Wattled broadbill with its thicker white collar and yellow wing patch. It is also smaller with sizes of 14-15 versus the 16–18 cm of the Wattled broadbill

Habitat and Conservation Status 
Its natural habitats are  tropical moist lowland forest, tropical mangrove forest, and  tropical moist shrubland with most records under 1,000 meters above sea level. It is often found foraging in the understorey and lower parts of the canopy.

IUCN has assessed this bird as vulnerable with the population being estimated at 2,500 to 9,999. Extensive lowland deforestation on all islands in its range is the main threat. Most remaining lowland forest that is not afforded protection leaving it vulnerable to both legal and Illegal logging, conversion into farmlands through Slash-and-burn and mining. There is only 4% forest remaining in Bohol and around 400 km2  of primary forest combined in Samar and Leyte with no respite in deforestation.

This occurs in a few protected areas such as Rajah Sikatuna Protected Landscape and Samar Island Natural Park however protection is lax.

Conservation actions proposed include to survey remaining habitat to better understand ecology and population size. Propose sites supporting key populations for protection and ensure that proposed protected areas receive actual protection from threats.

References

External links

BirdLife Species Factsheet.

Visayan broadbill
Endemic birds of the Philippines
Fauna of the Visayas
Fauna of Samar
Fauna of Leyte
Fauna of Bohol
Visayan broadbill
Visayan broadbill
Taxonomy articles created by Polbot